Joelson Santos Silva (born November 19, 1980 in Uruçuca-BA), or simply Joelson, is a Brazilian attacking midfielder for Villa Nova Atlético Clube.

Contract
6 July 2006 to 6 July 2009

External links

placar
CBF

1980 births
Living people
Brazilian footballers
Cruzeiro Esporte Clube players
Esporte Clube Democrata players
Santa Cruz Futebol Clube players
Esporte Clube Juventude players
Avaí FC players
Paraná Clube players
Ituano FC players
Al Hilal SFC players
Saudi Professional League players
Association football midfielders